Jasjit Singh Kular (born 30 December 1989) is an Indian field hockey player who plays as a forward. He was part of the Indian team that competed at the 2014 Men's Hockey World Cup.

References

External links
Player profile at Hockey India

1989 births
Living people
Field hockey players from Jalandhar
Indian male field hockey players
2014 Men's Hockey World Cup players